Adelaide is a mining ghost town in Lake County, in the U.S. state of Colorado. The site of the former town is located about one mile west of downtown Leadville through Stray Horse Gulch and two-thirds of a mile north of Nugget Gulch.

History
Adelaide was founded  1876. Variant names were "Park City" and "Finntown". A post office was in operation at Adelaide in 1878, and closed in 1879.

References

Geography of Lake County, Colorado
Ghost towns in Colorado